The Roman Catholic Diocese of San Felipe may refer to:

 Roman Catholic Diocese of San Felipe, Venezuela
 Roman Catholic Diocese of San Felipe, Chile